The men's 400 metre individual medley competition of the swimming event at the 2015 Southeast Asian Games was held on 9 June at the OCBC Aquatic Centre in Kallang, Singapore.

Records
Prior to this competition, the existing Asian and Games records were as follows:

Schedule

Results

Final

The final was held on 9 June.

References

External links
 

Men's 400 metre individual medley